El Laco is a volcanic complex in the Antofagasta Region of Chile. It is directly south of the Cordón de Puntas Negras volcanic chain. Part of the Central Volcanic Zone of the Andes, it is a group of seven stratovolcanoes and a caldera. It is about two million years old. The edifice has been affected by glaciation, and some reports indicate that it is still fumarolically active.

The volcano is known for its magnetite-containing lava flows of enigmatic origin. In total, there are four lava flows and two dykes, as well as a formation of uncertain nature. In addition to lava flow structures, pyroclastics containing iron oxide are also found within the complex. After their discovery in 1958, these iron deposits have been mined. Similar deposits of volcanic iron oxide exist in Australia, Chile, and Iran.

Geography 
El Laco is part of the Cordón de Puntas Negras sector of the Central Volcanic Zone, directly south of that volcanic chain. It sits atop a quartzite and sandstone basement that was lifted from the seaground during the Acadian orogeny and is of Ordovician age. Later, Mesozoic and Cenozoic sedimentation occurred, which was then buried by Tertiary rhyolites. Two major volcanic lineaments cross in the El Laco area, including the so-called Calama-Olacapato-El Toro lineament.

Other close towns are Calama and San Pedro de Atacama. The international road through Sico Pass connecting Salta in Argentina with Calama in Chile runs close to El Laco. A number of tourist sites are found in the Atacama Desert adjacent to El Laco, and the dry climate also makes the area suitable for astronomy facilities.

Geology 

The El Laco volcanic complex is formed by about seven minor stratovolcanoes and lava domes. The complex started its activity in the Miocene-Pliocene, when porphyric andesites formed a stratovolcano. Finally, probably during the Pleistocene, five iron-rich magmas were extruded, named Laco Sur, Laco Norte and Rodados Negros. Laquito and Cristales Grandes, two abyssal iron magma structures, date back to that era.

Pico Laco has been described as a resurgent volcano within a caldera, that is surrounded by secondary vents.

This cone is of dacitic composition. "Volcano 5009" is heavily eroded, and its core of lava and hyaloclastite has been exposed. Eruptive activity here probably coincided with glacier activity during the Pliocene, as evidenced by moraines in the area.

Ages of 10.5 to 1.6 mya have been estimated via potassium-argon dating of the andesite lavas and subvolcanic rocks. An age of 5.3±1.9 mya on lavas in the northern part of the volcanic complex is the oldest obtained date. Other dating has resulted in ages of 3.9±1.3 mya for Pico Laco's dome, 3.8±0.9 mya for lavas beneath San Vicente Bayo, 3.7±0.9 mya for a lava front next to Laco Norte, 2.6±0.6 for Crystales Grandes, 2.1±0.4 for Hueso Chico, and 1.6±0.5 for "Volcano 5009". Cordon de Puntas Negras has younger dates. Another date from Pico Laco is 2.0±0.3 mya; one study suggested four separate episodes of volcano development. Volcanic activity continued after the emplacement of the magnetite bodies. Later alteration included hydrothermal alteration and glacial erosion; the former has left bleached rocks and exhalation deposits. Some minor metasomatic alteration occurred at the contact sites between andesites and iron-containing rocks. Hydrothermal alteration has also been described for lower portions of the volcanic pile and probably occurred because of gases escaping from intruded magma. Moraines found west of El Laco were generated by glaciation both on El Laco and Puntas Negras. Surface exposure dating has indicated ages of 226 and 287 ka for some ice-affected lavas and argon-argon dating produced a youngest age of about 120,000 years. Further, andesitic volcanism in neighbouring volcanoes has blanketed El Laco. Reports exist of continuing fumarolic activity and hot springs with the deposition of clay and other minerals.

Iron-rich deposits 
The volcano is mainly known for these flows, but such material is also found in the form of tephra. The deposits lie on top of flat lava flows of andesitic composition, concentrically around Pico Laco. They are named Laco Norte, Laco Sur, San Vicente Alto, and San Vicente Bajo. The deposits consist of dykes, hydrothermal deposits, lava flows, pyroclastics, and subvolcanic structures and were erupted from parasitic vents and fissures. The magnetite is classified as porphyry-like. Apatite is present as an accessory mineral in the lavas and is abundant in the intrusions. Iron-rich zones also formed in tuffs and lavas. Magnetite in the subvolcanic bodies exists in more massive crystals. The iron-containing rocks include lava flows, ash, and lapilli, as well as ore breccias. The El Laco magnetite lava flows are unique in the world and formed during active subduction.

Individual deposits 
Of these deposits, Laco Norte is the largest and was probably separated from neighbouring Laquito by erosion. It was erupted from feeder dykes on its southern and eastern end and forms a table-shaped body on a spur, in the shape of a mesa. At Laco Norte, a structure of five layers is found: a basal andesite, ore in pyroclastic form, magnetite lava, pyroclastics which contain ore, and andesite at the top. San Vicente Alto is a lava flow on the upper parts of the volcano, and San Vicente Bajo is probably a lava dome. A magnetic layer of rock spreads north from the volcano, and a large magnetite body has been modelled beneath Pasos Blancos.

Structure and appearance 
The magnetite lavas are primarily aa lava, but other surface features are also found, including pahoehoe features. Columnar morphologies are found on the magnetite, implying that they cooled quickly. There is only one other place in the world where columnar magnetite has been found – Kiirunavaara, in Sweden. Large tubes coated on the inside by magnetite were formed in the lava by escaping gas. Both before and after the magnetite lavas, layers of magnetite-containing pyroclastics were erupted. A  aureole separates the magnetite rocks from the host rocks. The pyroclastic-like deposits are porous and fragile and show traces of stratification. The pyroclastics at Laco Sur contain spherules of magnetite. An age of 2.1±0.1 million years has been found for ore by fission track dating. The lavas contain veins likely generated by hydrothermal activity.

Origin 
Temperatures estimated for the erupted rocks cover a wide range, with some exceeding . These rocks are of enigmatic origin, which may be geothermal or magmatic, with the presence of lava bombs of magnetite lava and other evidence supporting the magmatic origin theory. The magma would have separated from a precursor magma due to immiscibility effects. Other viewpoints consider the texture and chemical composition of the rocks as evidence that metasomatism of andesitic rocks formed the magnetite "lavas". A third hypothesis envisages the crystallization of magnetite within a silicic magma and its subsequent extraction through volatile bubbles. The role of a post-magmatic fluid phase, which was inferred from inclusions in crystals, or of a combination of magmatic and hydrothermal mechanisms has also been suggested.

Some magnetite was oxidized to hematite, probably under the influence of rainwater as indicated by isotope analysis. Only a minor amount of hematite is primary. Isotope data indicate that the formation of this magnetite magma was accompanied by the segregation of plagioclase. This plagioclase may have generated the rhyodacite lava dome. An iron-phosphate-rich magma generated the magnetite lava flows after release of volatile substances. The magma was probably bordering on forming a two-phase melt containing nelsonite and rhyolite. A favourable tectonic context associated with the compression of the magma chamber and the presence of faults helped with the eruption of the magnetite. The magma formation probably occurred in a magma chamber. During the cooling of the magma, the ores formed. This process was probably not directed by water-rich phases, and the segregation occurred at a shallow depth. High phosphorus and volatile content may have lowered the melting point of the magma and facilitated its eruption, as well as overcoming density-based constraints on the eruption of iron-rich magmas; the magma would later have forcefully degassed within the volcano. Suggestions that anatexis of iron-rich sediments generated the iron-rich magmas appear implausible. The ultimate origin of the El Laco iron may be subducted metal-containing sediment.

Human history and exploitation 
These iron oxide deposits were found in 1958. Mining in Laco Sur removed about two million tons of magnetite between the 1970s and 1990s, leaving an open pit exposing  of rock. In 2009, these mineral reserves were mined by Cia Minera del Pacifico S.A. It is estimated that the deposit contains 733.9 million tons of ore, consisting of 50% iron. The geological interest in these kinds of mineral deposits is enhanced by their frequent association with other minerals, as has been noted at Olympic Dam, Australia.

Comparable deposits 
The Kiruna magnetites in Sweden resemble the El Laco ones in terms of manganese and vanadium content, and their titanium content is comparably low. The deposits at Kiruna and El Laco have been classified as "Iron oxide-apatite" ore deposits, and El Laco is the best preserved and youngest such deposit on Earth. Other deposits of volcanic iron ore are the Chilean Iron Belt, the Tertiary Cerro el Mercado deposit in Mexico, the Eocambrian Bafq district in Iran, and the Proterozoic Kiruna field in Sweden. Of these, Sierra Bandera in the Chilean iron belt may be another example of surface volcanic iron ore rather than subvolcanic ore as is commonly assumed of these deposits.

Petrology 
The main rocks of the volcano are andesite and dacite, which contain biotite and pyroxene as well as blebs containing iron oxide. The iron-containing rocks are a less important component. The whole rock falls into the calc-alkaline class of volcanic rocks, similar to these erupted by the neighbouring volcanoes Lascar and Llullaillaco. The andesites contain plagioclase clinopyroxene, orthopyroxene, and phenocrysts of magnetite. Magnetite, and in lesser measure hematite, are the most abundant iron minerals; anhydrite, diopside, goethite, limonite, maghemite, pyrite, scapolite and diadochite are also found. The lavas lost most of their sulfur and phosphorus after their eruption. High oxygen-18 amounts in the Laco magmas indicate either crustal contamination or isotopic effects during fractional crystallization. Some atmospheric water influence has been inferred from isotope data as well.

Hydrothermal alteration of the central lava dome and iron-bearing deposits has generated alunite, anatase, bassanite, chlorite, copper veinlets, gypsum, illite, jarosite, kaolinite, labradorite, quartz, rutile, sanidine, smectite, sulfur and tridymite. Some of these minerals forms veins inside the rock. Silification is prominent and has formed cristobalite and tridymite. Elemental sulfur is also found. Minor exhalation deposits are also found in the form of sulfates that sometimes conserve conduits. Red-coloured alteration halos occur in andesites adjacent to iron deposits, probably due to iron input. It is possible that the formation of the iron-rich magma was accompanied by the production of large amounts of hydrothermal fluids which then triggered the hydrothermal alteration.

Environment 

The vegetation in the area is primarily low bushland. Short-tailed chinchillas can be found at El Laco, one of the few occurrences of this threatened species in Chile.

El Laco has a classical cold mountain climate at the line between the dry Altiplano with summer precipitation and the hyper-arid Atacama Desert climate. The majority of precipitation falls during southern hemisphere summer; winter snowfall has been recorded. Air humidity recorded in 1991 was 10–30%.

References

External links 
 El Laco field excursion

Iron ore mines in Chile
Pleistocene stratovolcanoes
Pliocene stratovolcanoes
Miocene stratovolcanoes
Volcanoes of Antofagasta Region
Mines in Antofagasta Region